= Saleh Victor =

1. REDIRECT Draft:Saleh Victor (2)
